The Dubai Cricket Council Ground No 1 is a cricket venue in Dubai, UAE. The venue has hosted List A Matches during the champions trophy qualifying rounds in 2004/05, which the United States won.
The venue has also hosted 2000 Asian Cricket Council Trophy games

Cricket grounds in the United Arab Emirates
Football venues in the United Arab Emirates
Sports venues in Dubai
Multi-purpose stadiums in the United Arab Emirates